Dis Unu Fi Hear is the fourth studio album by Beenie Man.

Track listing
"Show Fi Flop" – 4:06
"If She Did Know" – 3:57
"Matey Nah Romp" – 3:55
"Baby Baby" (featuring Lukie D) – 3:57
"Seven Spanish Angels" – 4:07
"Make It Tan So Den" – 4:04
"Dis Unu Fi Hear" – 3:54
"The Big Man" – 3:59
"Nobody Is Perfect" (featuring Thriller U) – 4:08
"Nuff Things Fi Done" – 3:57
"Nuff Things Fi Done Remix" – 4:19
"Positive Vibration" – 4:28

References

Beenie Man albums
1994 albums